The following outline is provided as an overview of and topical guide to Northern Ireland.

Northern Ireland – one of the four countries of the United Kingdom. Situated in the northeast of the island of Ireland, it shares a border with the Republic of Ireland to the south and west. At the time of the 2001 UK Census, its population was 1,685,000, constituting about 30% of the island's total population and about 3% of the population of the United Kingdom.

Northern Ireland was created as a distinct division of the United Kingdom on 3 May 1921 under the Government of Ireland Act 1920, although its constitutional roots lie in the 1800 Act of Union between Great Britain and Ireland.

Northern Ireland was for many years the site of a violent and bitter ethno-political conflict — the Troubles — which was caused by divisions between Irish nationalists, who are predominantly Roman Catholic, and unionists, who are predominantly Protestant. Unionists want Northern Ireland to remain part of the United Kingdom, while nationalists wish it to be politically reunited with the rest of Ireland. Since the signing of the "Good Friday Agreement" in 1998, most of the paramilitary groups involved in the Troubles have ceased their armed campaigns.

General reference 
 Common English country name: Northern Ireland
 Official English country name: Northern Ireland
 Common endonym:
 
 Ulster Scots: Norlin Airlann
 Official endonym: Northern Ireland
 Adjectival: Northern Irish
 Demonym: Northern Irishman or Northern Irishwoman, Ulsterman or Ulsterwoman

Geography of Northern Ireland 

Geography of Northern Ireland
 Northern Ireland is: a constituent country of the United Kingdom. See Countries of the United Kingdom.
 Location
 Atlantic Ocean
 Northern Hemisphere
 Western Hemisphere
 Eurasia (but not on the mainland)
 Europe
 Northern Europe and Western Europe
 British Isles
 Ireland (the northeastern sixth of the island)
 Extreme points of Northern Ireland
 Population of Northern Ireland: 1,759,000 (2008 est)
 Area of Northern Ireland:  13 843 km² (5,345 square miles)
 Places in Northern Ireland
 Atlas of Northern Ireland

Environment of Northern Ireland 

 Climate of Northern Ireland
 Department of the Environment
 Geology of Northern Ireland
 Protected areas of Northern Ireland
 Special Areas of Conservation in Northern Ireland
 National parks of Northern Ireland
 List of Areas of Special Scientific Interest in Northern Ireland
 Wildlife of Northern Ireland
 Mammals of Northern Ireland

Natural geographic features of Northern Ireland 

 Coastal landforms of Northern Ireland
 Islands of Northern Ireland
 Boa Island
 Cannon Rock
 Coney Island, Lough Neagh
 Copeland Islands
 Derrywarragh Island
 Devenish Island
 Loughbrickland Crannóg
 Lusty Beg Island
 Lustymore Island
 Ram's Island
 Rathlin Island
 White Island, County Fermanagh
 Lakes ("loughs") in Northern Ireland
 Mountains and hills of Northern Ireland
 Hewitts in Northern Ireland
 Marilyns in Northern Ireland
 Rivers of Northern Ireland
 World Heritage Sites in Northern Ireland

Regions of Northern Ireland

Administrative divisions of Northern Ireland 

Administrative divisions of Northern Ireland

Municipalities of Northern Ireland 

 Capital of Northern Ireland: Belfast
 List of settlements in Northern Ireland
 Cities in Northern Ireland
 Towns and villages in Northern Ireland

Demography of Northern Ireland 

Demographics of Northern Ireland

Government and politics of Northern Ireland 

Politics of Northern Ireland
 Form of government:
 Capital of Northern Ireland: Belfast
 Taxation in Northern Ireland

Law and order in Northern Ireland 

Northern Ireland law
 Capital punishment in Northern Ireland: There has been a history but currently none
 Courts of Northern Ireland
 List of High Court Judges of Northern Ireland
 Crime in Northern Ireland
 Prostitution in Northern Ireland
 Founding laws of Northern Ireland
 Articles 2 and 3 of the Constitution of Ireland
 Government of Ireland Act 1920
 Belfast Agreement ("Good Friday Agreement")
 Northern Ireland Act 1998
 Human rights in Northern Ireland
 Freedom of religion in Northern Ireland
 LGBT rights in Northern Ireland
 Law enforcement in Northern Ireland
 Police Service of Northern Ireland (formerly the Royal Ulster Constabulary)
 Segregation in Northern Ireland

Local government in Northern Ireland 

Local government in Northern Ireland

Military of Northern Ireland

Political ideologies in Northern Ireland 

Nationalists
Republicanism
Irish National Liberation Army
Irish Republican Army
Official IRA
Provisional IRA
Continuity IRA
Real IRA
Irish Republican Brotherhood
Unionists
Loyalist
Red Hand Commandos
Ulster Defence Association (Ulster Freedom Fighters)
Ulster Young Militants
Ulster Volunteer Force
Loyalist Volunteer Force

History of Northern Ireland

By period

The Troubles 

The Troubles
1981 Irish Hunger Strike
Michael Devine
Kieran Doherty
Francis Hughes
Martin Hurson
Kevin Lynch
Raymond McCreesh
Joe McDonnell
Thomas McElwee
Patsy O'Hara
Bobby Sands
Johnny Adair
Anti H-Block
Armalite and ballot box strategy
Arms Crisis
Battle of the Bogside
Birmingham pub bombings
Birmingham Six
Blanket protest
Bloody Friday
Bloody Sunday
Bloody Sunday Inquiry
Border Campaign (IRA)
Boundary Commission (Ireland)
British Military Intelligence Systems in Northern Ireland
Chronology of the Northern Ireland Troubles
Claudy bombing
Combined Loyalist Military Command
Conflict Archive on the Internet
Corporals killings
Council of Ireland
Crumlin Road Gaol
Directory of the Northern Ireland Troubles
Dirty protest
Denis Donaldson
Drumcree Church
Emergency Powers Act (Northern Ireland) 1926
Denis Faul
Pat Finucane
Five techniques
Flags and Emblems (Display) Act (Northern Ireland) 1954
Forced disappearance
Martin Galvin
Government of Ireland Act 1920
Governor of Northern Ireland
Guildford pub bombing
Guildford Four
Historical Enquiries Team
Holy Cross dispute
Independent Commission on Policing for Northern Ireland
Independent International Commission on Decommissioning
Irish War of Independence
Kingsmill massacre
Lord Mountbatten
Loyalist Association of Workers
Maguire Seven
Maze prison (also known as Long Kesh)
Michael McKevitt
Danny McNamee
Milltown Cemetery attack
George Mitchell
Mitchell Principles
Murder triangle
NORAID
Northern Campaign (IRA)
Northern Ireland Civil Rights Association
Northern Ireland Constitution Act 1973
Northern Ireland Constitutional Convention
Northern Ireland Forum
Northern Ireland peace process
1973 Northern Ireland referendum
1998 Northern Ireland referendum
Official Sinn Féin
Omagh bombing
Operation Demetrius (also known as Internment)
Operation Motorman
Peace lines
People's Democracy (Ireland)
Plan Kathleen
Provisional IRA campaign 1969–1997
Provisional IRA South Armagh Brigade
Remembrance Day Bombing
Repartition of Ireland
Saor Uladh
Sean O'Callaghan
Shoot-to-kill policy in Northern Ireland
Stakeknife
Freddie Scappaticci
Stevens Report
Sunningdale Agreement
Supergrass
TUAS
Tara
Thiepval Barracks
Third Force
Tout
Ulster Clubs
Ulster Defence Regiment
Ulster Defence Volunteers
Ulster Project
Ulster Resistance
Ulster Special Constabulary
Ulster Unionist Labour Association
Ulster Workers Council
Ulster Workers' Council Strike
Ulsterisation
Unity
Warrenpoint ambush

By region

By county 

 History of County Antrim
 History of County Armagh
 History of County Fermanagh
 History of County Londonderry
 History of County Tyrone

By municipality 

 History of Belfast

By subject 

 History of the Jews in Northern Ireland
 History of local government in Northern Ireland

Culture of Northern Ireland 

Culture of Northern Ireland
 Celtic calendar
 Cultural icons of Northern Ireland
 Harp
 Red Hand of Ulster
 Shamrock
 Ethnic minorities in Northern Ireland
 Gardens in Northern Ireland
 Marriage in Northern Ireland
 Media in Northern Ireland
 Irish mythology
 Cúchulainn
 Ulster Cycle
 Museums in Northern Ireland
The Ormeau Baths Gallery
The Ulster Museum
 National symbols of Northern Ireland
 Coat of arms of Northern Ireland
 Flags used in Northern Ireland
 Flag of Northern Ireland
 Great Seal of Northern Ireland
 National anthem of Northern Ireland
 Parades in Northern Ireland
 People of Northern Ireland
 List of Northern Irish people
 Celt
 Modern Celts
 Irish diaspora
 Gaels
 Irish people
 List of Irish people
 Irish Traveller
 Prostitution in Northern Ireland
 Public holidays in Northern Ireland
 Saint Patrick's Day
 Other
 Apprentice Boys of Derry
 The Orange Order
 Orange walk
 Royal Black Preceptory

Architecture in Northern Ireland 

Architecture of Northern Ireland
 Abbeys and priories in Northern Ireland
 Castles in Northern Ireland
 Cathedrals in Northern Ireland
 Cenotaphs in Northern Ireland
 National Trust properties in Northern Ireland
 Historic houses in Northern Ireland
 Market Houses in Northern Ireland
 Shopping centres in Northern Ireland
 Victoria Square Shopping Centre
 High-rise buildings in Northern Ireland
 Obel Tower
 Windsor House

Art in Northern Ireland 

Art in Northern Ireland
 Artists of Northern Ireland
 Cinema of Northern Ireland
 Cinema of Ireland
 Cinema of the United Kingdom
 Films set in Northern Ireland
 Dance in Northern Ireland
 Folk art of Northern Ireland
 Banners in Northern Ireland
 Cenotaphs in Northern Ireland
 Murals in Northern Ireland
 Literature of Northern Ireland
 Poetry of Northern Ireland
 Television in Northern Ireland
 Theatre in Northern Ireland
 Irish dramatists

Music of Northern Ireland 

Music of Northern Ireland
 Folk music of Northern Ireland
 List of Irish ballads
 Billy Boys
 The Boyne Water
 Come Out Ye Black and Tans
 Danny Boy
 Four Green Fields
 Ireland's Call
 Lillibullero
 Londonderry Air
 The Men Behind the Wire
 The Mountains of Mourne
 The Patriot Game
 There Were Roses
 The Town I Loved So Well
 The Sash
 Star of the County Down

Cuisine of Northern Ireland 

Cuisine of Northern Ireland
 Barmbrack
 Irish breakfast
 Irish stew
 Irish whiskey
 Pork in Ireland
 Potato bread
 Soda bread
 Ulster fry
 Veda bread
 Dulse
 Yellowman (candy)

Language in Northern Ireland 

 Languages of Northern Ireland
 Irish language in Northern Ireland
 Pejoratives
 Fenian
 Millie
 MOPE
 Spide
 Taig
 West Brit
 Hun
 Orangie
 Prod

Religion in Northern Ireland 

Religion in Northern Ireland

Religious places 

 Abbeys and priories in Northern Ireland
 Cathedrals in Ireland
 Cemeteries in Northern Ireland
 Cenotaphs in Northern Ireland

Religions in Northern Ireland 

 Bahá'í Faith in Northern Ireland
 Christianity in Northern Ireland
 Association of Baptist Churches in Ireland
 Church of Ireland
 Church of Ireland dioceses
 Methodist Church in Ireland
 Non-subscribing Presbyterian Church of Ireland
 Presbyterian Church in Ireland
 Church House
 General Assembly
 Irish Presbyterians
 Moderator
 Union Theological College
Reformed Presbyterian Church (denominational group)
Free Presbyterian Church of Ulster
 Roman Catholicism in Northern Ireland
 Irish Catholic
 Roman Catholic dioceses of Ireland
 Hinduism in Northern Ireland
 Islam in Northern Ireland
 History of the Jews in Northern Ireland
Primates
Primate of All Ireland
Primate of Ireland

Sport in Northern Ireland 

Sport in Northern Ireland
 Cricket in Northern Ireland
Northern Ireland cricket team
Football in Northern Ireland
 Irish Football Association
 Irish Football League
 Northern Ireland national football team
 Gaelic Games
 Gaelic Athletic Association
 Ulster GAA
 All-Ireland Senior Football Championship
 All-Ireland Senior Hurling Championship
 Rugby in Northern Ireland
 Rugby union in Northern Ireland
 Irish rugby union system
 Pro14
 AIB League
 Ireland national rugby union team
 Special Olympics
 2003 Special Olympics World Summer Games
 Swim Ireland
 Tennis Ireland
 Basketball Ireland

Economy and infrastructure of Northern Ireland 

Economy of Northern Ireland
 Economic rank (by nominal GDP):
 Communications in Northern Ireland
 Internet in Northern Ireland
 Currency of the United Kingdom: Pound sterling
 Tourism in Northern Ireland
 Water supply and sanitation in Northern Ireland

Transport in Northern Ireland 

Transport in Northern Ireland

 Airports in Northern Ireland
 Belfast International Airport
 City of Derry Airport
 George Best Belfast City Airport
 Common Travel Area
 Rail transport in Northern Ireland
 Armagh rail disaster
 History of rail transport in Ireland
 Roads in Northern Ireland
 List of A roads in Northern Ireland
 List of B roads in Northern Ireland
 Translink
 Metro (formerly Citybus)
 Northern Ireland Railways
 Ulsterbus

Education in Northern Ireland 

Education in Northern Ireland
 Boards of Education
 Belfast Education and Library Board
 North Eastern Education and Library Board
 South Eastern Education and Library Board
 Southern Education and Library Board
 Western Education and Library Board
 Council for the Curriculum, Examinations and Assessment
 Department of Education
 Department for Employment and Learning
 Integrated Education
 List of Irish learned societies
 Union of Students in Ireland

Specific schools 

 Public schools in Northern Ireland
 Primary schools in Northern Ireland
 Secondary schools in Northern Ireland
 Grammar schools in Northern Ireland
 Integrated schools in Northern Ireland
 Gaelic medium primary schools in Northern Ireland
 Universities in Northern Ireland

Types of schools 

 Grammar schools in the United Kingdom
 Private school
 Preparatory school

Health in Northern Ireland
 Health and Social Care in Northern Ireland
 Hospitals in Northern Ireland

See also 

 Outline of geography
 Outline of the Republic of Ireland
 Outline of the United Kingdom
 BT postcode area

References

External links 

 1
 
Northern Ireland